Fabiani is a surname. Notable people with the surname include:

Alessia Fabiani (born 1976), Italian model and television personality
Fabio Fabiani (born 1974), Italian racing driver
Francesco de Fabiani (born 1993), Italian cross country skier
Joel Fabiani (born 1936), American actor
Harish Fabiani, Madrid-based, Non-Resident Indian businessman
Jean-Louis Fabiani (born 1951), French sociologist, professor of sociology and social anthropology
Linda Fabiani (born 1956), Scottish politician
Mark D. Fabiani (born 1957), American political strategist and crisis management expert
Max Fabiani (1865–1962), Italian architect
Raúl Fabiani (born 1984), Equatoguinean footballer
Roland Fabiani (born 1971), Scottish footballer

See also
Fabian (disambiguation)